Rubio Connor (born September 2, 1984) is an Aruban football player. He made a single appearance for the Aruba national team in 2004 as a substitute.

National team statistics

References

1984 births
Living people
Aruban footballers
Association football defenders
Aruba international footballers